Farinaz Koushanfar is an Iranian-American computer scientist whose research concerns embedded systems, ad-hoc networks, and computer security. She is a professor and Henry Booker Faculty Scholar of Electrical and Computer Engineering at the University of California, San Diego.

Education and career
Koushanfar obtained her bachelor's degree in electrical engineering from Sharif University of Technology (BSEE 1998), a master's degree in electrical engineering and computer science from the University of California, Los Angeles in 2000, and a second master's degree in statistics and Ph.D. in electrical engineering and computer science from the University of California, Berkeley in 2005, with the dissertation Ensuring data integrity in sensor-based networked systems jointly supervised by Alberto Sangiovanni-Vincentelli and Miodrag Potkonjak.

After postdoctoral research at the University of Illinois Urbana-Champaign, she joined the faculty of Rice University in 2006. She moved to her present position in San Diego in 2015.

Recognition
In 2008, Koushanfar was listed in the MIT Technology Review "35 Innovators Under 35" for her work using random variation in integrated circuits as a device fingerprint allowing manufacturers to validate the authenticity of devices. Her 2008 paper "Lightweight Secure PUFs" was given the Ten Year Retrospective Most Influential Paper Award in 2017 at the International Conference on Computer Aided Design.

She was named a Presidential Early Career Award for Scientists and Engineers in 2010
and an IEEE Fellow in 2019, "for contributions to hardware and embedded systems security and to privacy-preserving computing". She was named to the 2022 class of ACM Fellows, "for contributions to secure computing and privacy-preserving machine learning".

Selected publications

Resources

External links 
Home page

Year of birth missing (living people)
Living people
Iranian computer scientists
American computer scientists
American women computer scientists
Sharif University of Technology alumni
University of California, Los Angeles alumni
UC Berkeley College of Engineering alumni
American electrical engineers
American women engineers
Rice University faculty
University of California, San Diego faculty
Tehran Farzanegan School alumni
Iranian emigrants to the United States
Fellow Members of the IEEE
21st-century Iranian women
21st-century American women scientists
Iranian women scientists
Fellows of the Association for Computing Machinery